Steve Little (June 9, 1965 – January 30, 2000) was an American former professional boxer who competed from 1983 to 1998, having held the WBA super middleweight champion in 1994. He is best known for his victories over Pipino Cuevas and Michael Nunn.

Amateur boxing career

Professional boxing career
Little turned professional in 1983 and while he won his first four bouts, he soon started compiling losses. Even with a mediocre record, he fought for the WBO light-middleweight title against John David Jackson in 1989. He lost by a technical knockout. He retired for a short time after that fight.

In 1994 he scored an upset victory over Lineal and WBA super-middleweight champion Michael Nunn by split decision in London. He lost the belt in his first defense to Frankie Liles, losing a decision.  Although he later fought James Toney and Arthur Williams, he never fought for another major title.

Besides being a professional boxer, Little also sold used cars in Reading.

Little retired in 1998 and died from colon cancer in 2000, at the young age of 34.  He left behind a wife and six children.

Professional boxing record

Championship titles held
 Pennsylvania State - Super Middleweight (1991)
 Lineal - Super Middleweight (1994)
 WBA - Super Middleweight (1994)
 WBC FECARBOX - Super Middleweight (1996)
 IBC - Super Middleweight (1996)

See also
List of super middleweight boxing champions
List of WBA world champions

References

External links
 
 Steve Little - CBZ Profile

1965 births
2000 deaths
Boxers from Philadelphia
World boxing champions
American male boxers
Middleweight boxers